Sonasan railway station (code:SNSN) is situated on Ahmedabad–Udaipur Line serves Sonasan, Gujarat, India. Ten trains halt at this station each day.

References 

Ahmedabad railway division
Railway stations in Sabarkantha district